BWH generally refers to the Bust/waist/hip measurements.

BWH, Bwh, or BWh could also refer to:
 BWh, the Köppen climate classification of hot deserts
 BWH, Bust/waist/hip measurements
 Brigham and Women's Hospital
 IATA code of Butterworth Airport in Malaysia